Beauty Lake is a lake in Park County, Montana, in the United States.

Beauty Lake was named for its natural scenery.

See also
List of lakes in Montana

References

Lakes of Montana
Bodies of water of Park County, Montana